Resol  may refer to:
 RESOL, a German solar thermal technology company based in Hattingen
 a type of phenol formaldehyde resin
 See  Novolacks